Dirty Soap is an American reality television series that debuted on E! on September 25, 2011. The hour-long series focuses on the personal and professional lives of daytime soap opera stars and their off-screen time. The series is being produced by Kelly Ripa, Mark Consuelos, and Amber Mazzola. On January 25, 2012, E! cancelled the series after its only season.

Cast
 Kelly Monaco – Monaco is best known to fans as a regular on General Hospital, and a contestant on Dancing with the Stars. Having ended an eighteen-year relationship, Monaco wants to return to the dating scene.
 Kirsten Storms – Storm's resume includes Days of Our Lives and General Hospital. She is also best friends with Kelly, whom she comforts about an ended relationship. She grows seriously ill in the middle of the season.
 Farah Fath – Fath is another alum of Days of our Lives where she and Kirsten were regulars. She later joined the cast of One Life to Live. A former 1995 Miss Kentucky Preteen Pageant winner, Fath entered the business in 1999. She considers Storms a "frenemy" and is involved in a bi-coastal relationship with OLTL co-star John-Paul Lavoisier.
 Nadia Bjorlin – Another cast member of Days of our Lives, Bjorlin has also expanded her talents to primetime and wants to pursue a film career. She is involved in a live-in relationship with actor Brandon Beemer.
 Jenna Gering – A native of Ft. Lauderdale, Florida, Jenna Gering has been acting on TV and film for over 15 years. She is married to Galen Gering. 
 Galen Gering – Galen Gering, a former model, is another Days of Our Lives cast member. He is also an alumnus of the former NBC soap/fantasy Passions. 
 John-Paul Lavoisier – Lavoisier, an alumnus of the University of the Arts in Philadelphia, entered the business in 2002 when he joined the cast of One Life to Live. He is involved in a bi-coastal dating relationship with Fath.
 Brandon Beemer – Another cast member of Days of our Lives, Beemer later became a regular on The Bold and the Beautiful. He is involved in a live-in relationship with Nadia and also wants to expand his acting resume.

Episodes

References

External links
 

Dirty Soap Recaps And News

2011 American television series debuts
2010s American reality television series
2011 American television series endings
E! original programming
English-language television shows
Television series about television